Ganapatya is a denomination of Hinduism that worships Ganesha (also called Ganapati) as the Saguna Brahman.

Beliefs
The worship of Ganesha is considered complementary with the worship of other deities. Hindus of all sects begin prayers, important undertakings, and religious ceremonies with an invocation of Ganesha, because of Ganesha's role as the god of beginnings. But although most Hindu sects do revere Ganesha, the Ganapatya sect goes further than that, and declares Ganesha to be the supreme being. Ganapatya is one of the five principal Hindu sects which focus on a particular deity, alongside Shaivism, focussed on Shiva, Shaktism, focussed on Shakti, Vaishnavism, focused on Vishnu, and Saura, focussed on Surya. While Ganapatya is not as large a sect as the other four, it still has been influential. In this system, the five deities Ganesha, Vishnu, Shiva, Devī, and Sūrya are viewed as five equal forms of one Nirguna Brahman.

History

Ganapati has been worshipped as part of Shaivism since at least the fifth century. A specific Ganapatya sect probably began to appear between the sixth and ninth centuries: six sects are mentioned in the Sankara digvijaya (life of Adi Shankara) by Anandigiri. It reached a high point about the tenth century, and built temples dedicated to Ganesha, the largest of which is the Ucchi Pillayar Koil (the Columns Hall of a Thousand Pillars), on the Rock Fort of Tiruchirapalli in Tamil Nadu. Ganesha is worshipped as the Supreme Being (Para Brahman) in this sect. Being the chief deity in this form of Hinduism, he is known by the epithet Parameshwara (Supreme God), which is normally reserved for Shiva.

Moraya Gosavi
Later, the sect was popularized by Morya Gosavi. According to one source, he found an idol of Ganapati not made by human hands, and built the Moragao temple near Pune in the 14th century. According to another, he experienced visions of Ganapati at the Morgaon shrine, and was entombed alive (jeeva samadhi) in 1651, in a Ganesha temple at his birthplace in Chinchwad.

Following him, the Ganapatya sect became prominent between the seventeenth and nineteenth centuries in Maharashtra in south western India, centering on Cinchwad. Its centre is still among high-caste Hindus in the Marathi-speaking Maharashtra, and it is important in the rest of South India. Devotees hold an annual pilgrimage between Chinchwad and Moragao.

Sect marks include a red circle on the forehead, or the brands of an elephant face and tusk on the shoulders.

See also
 Herambasuta
 Mahaganapati
 Thirty-two forms of Ganesha

References

External links
 Article from BookRags.com
Ganapatya Encyclopædia Britannica article

Ganesha
Hindu denominations